Krzysztof Pilarz (born 9 November 1980) is a former professional football goalkeeper from Poland.

In 2004 Pilarz scored a penalty for Pogoń Szczecin in an 8-1 win over Mazowsze Grójec in the Polish Cup.

References

External links
 
 

1980 births
Living people
People from Nowy Dwór Gdański County
Sportspeople from Pomeranian Voivodeship
Polish footballers
Association football goalkeepers
Jeziorak Iława players
Lechia Gdańsk players
RKS Radomsko players
Pogoń Szczecin players
GKS Bełchatów players
Odra Wodzisław Śląski players
Ruch Chorzów players
MKS Cracovia (football) players
Bruk-Bet Termalica Nieciecza players
Arka Gdynia players
Olimpia Elbląg players
Ekstraklasa players
I liga players
II liga players